Sexy Herpes is an Australian comedy web series written by Madeleine Dyer and Dan Mulvihill. It was produced by Mad Dan Productions and Beyondedge in 2017.
Sexy Herpes is a workplace comedy, set in a sexual health clinic, where the staff are as dysfunctional as their patients.

The series was released on YouTube in September 2017 and made its Australian TV debut on free to air television channel 9Go! in April 2018. It also streams through 9Now.

Cast 
 Zoe McDonald as Sarah
 Genevieve Morris as Barb
 Katie Castles as Mullen
 Jay K. Cagatay as Karen
 Chloe Ng as Jackie
 Mark Silveria as Greg
 Rohan Nichol as Phillip
 Veronica Thomas as Clare
 Harriet Dyer as Becky
 Paul Denny as Dean
 Jason Geary as Warren
 Nicholas Capper as Joey
 Neil Foley as Neil
 Jack Doherty as Jack
 Dave Todman as Liam
 Lisa Hanley as Fiona
 Natalie Corrigan as Gabby
 Diana Dyer as Jeanette
 David Shire as Luke
 John Dyer as Mal
 Mark Dyer as Marty

Episodes 
 Episode 1: "The Horse, The Nurse & The Labia"
Sarah and team try to navigate through a few odd patient experiences, whilst seeking refuge at the local pub. 
 Episode 2: "The Break Up"
Sarah lets her troubled romantic life affect her treatment of a patient.
 Episode 3: "Pizza & Sadness"
Post break up, Karen & Jackie, try to boost Sarah's spirits by getting her back on the dating scene.
 Episode 4: "Dead Mother"
Karen tries to guilt Sarah to go on a date with her friend.
 Episode 5: "Who Wants To Netflix & Chill?"
Sarah unexpectedly finds a romantic spark between her and trainee nurse, Clare, at the clinic.
 Episode 6: "How To Be Happy"
Sarah and the team confront their collective demons in their personal lives to pursue a happy existence. However, things don't go to plan.

References

External links 
  
 

Australian comedy television series
2017 Australian television series debuts